Atanas Vasilev Andonov (born July 16, 1955) is a retired male decathlete from Bulgaria. He set his personal best (8199 points) in 1981. Andonov is married to high jumper Lyudmila Andonova.

Achievements

The above are the olympic results of Atanas Andonov.

References
sports-reference

1955 births
Living people
Bulgarian decathletes
Athletes (track and field) at the 1980 Summer Olympics
Olympic athletes of Bulgaria